Prior to the Conquest of Wales, completed in 1282, Wales consisted of a number of independent kingdoms, the most important being Gwynedd, Powys, Deheubarth (originally Ceredigion, Seisyllwg and Dyfed) and Morgannwg (Glywysing and Gwent).  Boundary changes and the equal division of patrimony meant that few princes ever came close to ruling the whole of Wales. The names of those known to have ruled over one or more of the kingdoms are listed below. The only person known to have ruled all of Wales was Gruffydd ap Llywelyn (c. 1010–1063), a prince of Gwynedd who became King of Wales from 1055 to 1063. However, the princes of the medieval period hailing largely from west Wales, mainly Gwynedd, had such significant authority that allowed them to claim authority beyond the borders of their kingdoms. This allowed many Princes to claim to rule all Wales.

Rhodri Mawr has been suggested by some as the first sovereign of Wales, and the first to unite most of Wales. The modern-day territory of Wales was only fully united under the direct rule of Gruffydd ap Llywelyn from 1055 to 1063 according to historian John Davies. The native use of the title 'Prince of Wales' appeared more frequent by the eleventh century as a 'modernised' or reformed form of the old high kingship of the Britons. The native use of the titles ended following the killing of Llywelyn the Last and his brother, Dafydd ap Gruffydd and since then the Prince of Wales title has been used by the English and then British monarchy.

Title of "King of Wales" 

Rhodri Mawr has been suggested by some as the first sovereign of Wales, and the first to unite most of Wales.

Before Welsh Kings 
Prior to the King or Prince of Wales title, the title King of the Britons was used to describe the King of the Celtic Britons, ancestors of the Welsh. The Brut y Tywysogion, Gwentian Chronicles of Caradoc of Llancarvan version, which was written no earlier than the mid 16th century lists multiple Kings of the Britons as a "King of Wales".

List of  titleholders of "King of Wales" 
The following is a list of those assigned or claiming the title of King or Prince of Wales, including "Sovereigns and Princes of Wales 844 – 1283". While many different leaders in Wales claimed the title of 'King of Wales' and ruled majorities of Wales, the modern-day territory of Wales was only fully united under the direct rule of Gruffydd ap Llywelyn from 1055 to 1063 according to historian John Davies. Gruffydd ap Llywelyn was referred to as King of Wales or Rex Walensium by John of Worcester. He was the last of a long line of paramount rulers among the insular Britons to have the title of King of the Britons bestowed upon him, and possibly the only one to truly rule over all the (independent) Britons. By this time, if not earlier, Wales was the only part of Britain remaining under Brittonic rule.

Native title of "Prince of Wales"

Evolution from King to Prince 
The native use of the title 'Prince of Wales' appeared more frequent by the eleventh century as a 'modernised' or reformed form of the old high kingship of the Britons. The Welsh had originally been the high Kings of the Britons up until the claim to be high king of late Romano-British Britain was no longer realistic after the death of Cadwaladr in 664. Cadwaldr was also heavily associated with the symbol of the Red Dragon of Wales.  The princes of the medieval period hailed largely from west Wales, mainly Gwynedd. They had such significant authority that allowed them to claim authority beyond the borders of their kingdoms. This allowed many Princes to claim to rule all Wales.

End of native Welsh Princes 

Llywelyn the Last, the last Prince of Wales was ambushed and killed in 1282. The execution of his brother Dafydd ap Gruffydd in 1283 on the orders of King Edward I of England effectively ended Welsh independence. The title of Prince of Wales was then used by the English monarchy for the heir to the English throne.

During the period 1400–1413, following a rebellion against English rule in Wales, there existed a native Prince of Wales, Owain Glyndwr and an English monarchy appointed Prince of Wales (who later became Henry V of England). The native Prince of Wales, Owain Glyndwr led Welsh forces against the English Prince of Wales and English rule in Wales.

Regional Kingdoms of Wales

Deheubarth 

The kingdom of Deheubarth was formed by the union of the kingdoms of Ceredigion, Seisyllwg and Dyfed. Ceredigion was absorbed into Seisyllwg and Dyfed was merged with Seisyllwg to form Deheubarth in 909.

Ceredigion 
Ceredig ap Cunedda (424–453)
Usai (453–490)
Serwyl (490–525)
Boddw (525–560)
Arthfoddw (560–595)
Arthlwys (595–630)
Clydog I (630–665)

Dyfed 
Anwn Ddu (Welsh rendering of Antonius the Black). According to Welsh legend, born in Greece, and later appointed to the rule of Demetia (Dyfed) by Magnus Maximus. Also known as Anwn Dynod (rendering Antonius Donatus). Realm included Gwent and Brycheiniog.
Ednyfed - realm also included the Caer-Went part of Gwent (his brother received the remainder)
Clotri
Triffyn Farfog 
Aergol Lawhir (?-c. 515)
Vortiporius (c. 540)
Arthur ap Pedr
Cloten (c. 630) married Ceindrech of Brycheiniog, uniting the two kingdoms of Dyfed and Brycheiniog
Rhain ap Cadwgan (c. 690-740) - also king of Brycheiniog. On his death, his kingdoms were divided again by his sons.
Tewdwr ap Rhain
Maredudd ap Tewdws (c. 740–797)
Rhain ap Maredudd (c. 797–808)
Owain ap Maredudd (c. 808–810)
Triffyn ap Rhain (?-c. 814)
Hyfaidd
Llywarch ap Hyfaidd (c. 893-904)
Rhodri ap Hyfaidd (c. 904-905)
Hywel Dda ("Hywel the Good") (c. 905-909), an invader from Seisllywg who conquered Dyfed (but later chronicles claim he acquired it by marrying Llywarch's daughter)

Seisyllwg 
 Seisyll ap Clydog, prince of Ceredigion (eponym and possibly founder of Seisyllwg)
 Arthen (?-807)
 Dyfnwallon
 Meurig of Seisyllwg
 Gwgon of Seisyllwg (?-c. 870/871)
House Manaw
 Angharad ferch Meurig (?-872) and Rhodri the Great (?–873/877/878) - stewards
 Cadell ap Rhodri, second son of Anghared and Rhodri (872–909)
 Hywel Dda (Hywel the Good) (909-920) - he ruled Seisyllwg in 920 and shortly thereafter merged it with Dyfed into Deheubarth

Deheubarth 
 Hywel Dda (Hywel the Good) (920–950)
 His son, Owain ap Hywel (950–986) 
 Rhodri ap Hywel (950–953) and
 Edwin ap Hywel (950–954)
 Owain ap Hywel's son, Maredudd ab Owain (986–999)
 Cynan ap Hywel, prince of Gwynedd (999–1005)
 the sons of Einion ab Owain (brother of Maredudd ab Owain), who ruled jointly:
 Edwin ab Einion (1005–1018)
 Cadell ab Einion (1005–1018)
 Llywelyn ap Seisyll, prince of Gwynedd (1018–1023)
 Rhydderch ap Iestyn, prince of Glywysing (1023–1033)
 Edwin ab Einion's son, Hywel ab Edwin (1033–1044)
 Rhydderch ap Iestyn's son, Gruffydd ap Rhydderch (1047–1055)
 Gruffydd ap Llywelyn, invader and prince of Gwynedd (1055–1063)
 Edwin ab Einion's grandson, Maredudd ab Owain ab Edwin (1063–1072)
 his brother, Rhys ab Owain (1072–1078)
 his second cousin, Rhys ap Tewdwr (1078–1093)

Deheubarth was in the possession of the Normans from 1093 to 1155

 Gruffydd ap Rhys (1116–1137) ruled a portion of Deheubarth with Norman permission
 his son, Anarawd ap Gruffydd (1136–1143)
 his brother, Cadell ap Gruffydd (1143–1151)
 his brother, Maredudd ap Gruffydd (1151–1155)
 his brother, The Lord Rhys (Rhys ap Gruffydd)  (1155–1197)
 his son, Gruffydd ap Rhys (1197–1201) who for a time ruled jointly with his brother,
 Maelgwn ap Rhys (1199–1230)  who disputed the territory with his brother,
 Rhys the Hoarse (Rhys Gryg) (1216–1234)

From 1234 to 1283, Deheubarth was subject to the princes of Gwynedd

 Rhys the Hoarse's son, Rhys Mechyll (1234–1244) ruled a portion of Deheubarth
 his brother, Maredudd ap Rhys (1244–1271) ruled a portion of Deheubarth
 his son, Rhys ap Maredudd (1271–1283) ruled a portion of Deheubarth

Gwynedd

Kings of Gwynedd 
 Cunedda Wledig ap Edern (Cunedda the Imperator) (c. 450–c. 460)
 Einion Yrth ap Cunedda (Einion the Impetuous) (c. 470–c. 480)
 Owain Ddantgwyn (Rhos; late 5th century)
 Cynlas Goch (Rhos) & St Einion (Llŷn) ap Owain (late 5th and early 6th century)
 Cadwallon Lawhir ap Einion (Cadwallon Long Hand) (c. 500–c. 534)
 Maelgwn Hir ap Cadwallon (Maelgwn the Tall) (c. 520–c. 547)
 Rhun Hir ap Maelgwn (Rhun the Tall) (c. 547–c. 580)
 Beli ap Rhun (c. 580–c. 599)
 Iago ap Beli (c. 599–c. 616)
 Cadfan ap Iago (c. 613–c. 625)
 Cadwallon ap Cadfan (c. 625–634)
 Cadafael Cadomedd ap Cynfeddw (Cadfael the Battle-Shirker) (634–c. 655)
 Cadwaladr Fendigaid ap Cadwallon (Cadwallader the Blessed) (c. 655–c. 682)
 Idwal Iwrch ap Cadwaladr (Idwal Roebuck) (c. 682–c. 720)
 Rhodri Molwynog ap Idwal (Rhodri the Bald and Gray) (c. 720–c. 754)
 Caradog ap Meirion (c. 754–c. 798)
 Cynan Dindaethwy ap Rhodri (c. 798–816)
 Hywel ap Rhodri Molwynog (814–825)
 Merfyn Frych ap Gwriad (Merfyn the Freckled) (825–844)
 Rhodri Mawr ap Merfyn (Rhodri the Great) (844–878)
 Anarawd ap Rhodri (878–916) (establishes the Aberffraw dynasty, the senior branch of descendants from Rhodri Mawr)
 Idwal Foel ab Anarawd (Idwal the Bald) (916–942)
 Hywel Dda ap Cadell (Howell the Good) (942–950) (Dinefwr dynasty of Rhodri Mawr's descendants usurp from Aberffraw)
 Iago ab Idwal (950–979) (return to the Aberffraw branch)
 Ieuaf ab Idwal (950–969)
 Hywel ab Ieuaf (974–985)
 Cadwallon ab Ieuaf (985–986)
 Maredudd ab Owain (986–999) (return to Dinefwr dynasty)
 Cynan ap Hywel (999–1005) (return to the Aberffraw dynasty)
 Aeddan ap Blegywryd (1005–1018) (usurpation from the Aberffraw dynasty)
 Llywelyn ap Seisyll (1018–1023) (cadet branch of Mathrafal dynasty from Powys usurps from Aeddan ap Blegywryd)
 Iago ab Idwal ap Meurig (1023–1039) (return to Aberffraw dynasty)
 Gruffydd ap Llywelyn (1039–1063) (usurpation from Aberffraw dynasty)
 Bleddyn ap Cynfyn (1063–1075) (Mathrafal dynasty of Powys "receives" Gwynedd from the English King)
 Trahaearn ap Caradog (1075–1081)
 Gruffudd ap Cynan (1081–1137) (return to Aberffraw dynasty)

 Owain Gwynedd ap Gruffydd (1137–1170) (first to style himself Princeps Wallensium)
 Maelgwn ab Owain Gwynedd (1170–1173)
 Dafydd ab Owain Gwynedd (1170–1195) (in the east)
 Rhodri ab Owain Gwynedd (1170–1190) (in the west)
 Llywelyn Fawr ap Iorwerth (Llywelyn the Great) (1195–1240)
 Dafydd ap Llywelyn (1240–1246) (used title Prince of Wales from 1244 onwards)
 Owain Goch ap Gruffydd (Owen the Red) (1246–1255)
 Llywelyn ap Gruffudd (Llywelyn the Last) (1246–1282) (used title Prince of Wales from 1258 onwards)
 Dafydd ap Gruffydd (1282–1283) (not crowned but claimed the title)
 Madog ap Llywelyn (1294–1295) (not crowned but claimed the title)
 Owain ap Tomas ap Rhodri (Owen the Red Hand) (1372–1378) (in exile but claimed the title)

Morgannwg 

The kingdom of Morgannwg was formed by the union of the kingdoms of Morgannwg and  Gwent. Over time, in a few instances, the kingdoms were separate and independent.

Glywysing 

 Eugenius, son of Magnus Maximus
 Marius, son of Eugenius
 Solar, son of Marius
 Glywys, son of Solar (c. 470–c. 480), who gave his name to the kingdom
 Gwynllyw, son of Glywys, ruler of Gwynllwg (c. 480–523), cantref of Glywysing
 Pawl, son of Glywys, ruler of Penychen (c. 480–540), cantref of Glywysing
 Mechwyn, son of Glywys, ruler of Gorfynydd (c. 480–c.500), cantref  of Glywysing
 Cadoc, son of Gwynllyw, ruler of Gwynllwg (523–580) and Penychen (540–580), died without heirs

Glywysing is ruled by the Kings of Gwent until Rhys ap Ithel

 Rhys ap Ithel/Rhys ab Idwal, son of the Kings of Gwent (c. 755–785), with brothers, Rhodri and Meurig
 Arthfael Hen ap Rhys (Arthfael the Old) (785–c. 825) with Brochfael ap Rhys
 Rhys ap Arthfael, (c. 830–c. 840)
 Hywel ap Rhys, (c. 840–886)
 Owain ap Hywel (886–) 
 Gruffydd ab Owain (–934) King of Gower 
 Cadwgan ab Owain (–950) King of West Glywysing
 Morgan the Old (Morgan Hen or Morgan ab Owain or Moragn Hen Fawr) (930–974) united the former kingdoms of Gwent and Glywysing in 942 under the name of Morgannwg, but they were broken up again immediately after his death, remaining separate until about 1055
 Morgan the Old's son, Owain ap Morgan (974–c. 983) 
 brothers of Owain ap Morgan (Idwallon, Hywel and Cadell) (dates unknown)
 his son, Rhys ab Owain (c. 990–c. 1000) who ruled Glywysing jointly with his brothers
 Ithel the Black, son Idwallon (990)
 Hywel ab Owain (c. 990–c. 1043) and
 Iestyn ab Owain (c. 990–c. 1015)
 his son, Rhydderch ap Iestyn (c. 1015–1033) 
 his son, Gruffydd ap Rhydderch (1033–1055)
 Gwrgant ab Ithel the Black (1033 - 1070)
 Gruffydd ap Llywelyn, invader and prince of Gwynedd (1055–1063)
 Gruffydd ap Rhydderch's son, Caradog ap Gruffydd (1063–1081) who was a subject of the King of Gwent and King of Morgannwg Cadwgan ap Meurig before he deposed him and took the kingdom for himself
 Iestyn ap Gwrgan(t) (1081–1091), the last ruler of an independent Morgannwg, which was thereafter in the possession of the Normans and became the lordship of Glamorgan

Gwent 
 Anwn Ddu (the same person as ruled Dyfed at this time). Welsh legend claims he was appointed by Magnus Maximus, who later became Roman Emperor (and hence referred to in Welsh as Macsen Wledig - Maximus the Emperor). Some genealogies claim him to be Magnus' son. His realm was divided upon his death between his sons Edynfed and Tudwal.

in Caer-Went 
Edynfed ap Anwn - also ruler of Dyfed
  ap Ednyfed, and his wife - St Madrun ferch Gwerthefyr (Welsh rendering of Honorius)
 Iddon ap Ynyr (480 - 490)
 Caradog (Strongarm)
 Meurig ap Caradog and his wife - Dyfwn ferch Glywys
 Erbic ap Meurig ?

in Caer-Leon 
 Tudwal ap Anwn
 Teithrin ap Tudwal
 Teithfallt ap Teithrin (Welsh rendering of Theudebald)
 Tewdrig, son of  Teithfallt (490 – 493/517) (Welsh rendering of Theodoric). Traditionally, Tewdrig had a daughter - Marchell verch Tewdrig - for whom he carved out Brycheiniog as a dowry.
 Meurig ap Tewdrig King of Gwent (493/517 – 530–540)
 Athrwys ap Meurig King of Gwent (530–540 - 573)
 Frioc ap Meurig, with Idnerth ap Meurig ?
 Ithel ap Athrwys
 Morgan the Great ?
 Morgan the Courteous and Benefactor ? (-654)
 Anthres ap Morcant ? (654-663)                                                               
 Morgan the Generous (-730)
 Ithel ap Morgan (710/715 - 735/740/745/755)
 Ffernfael ab Idwal (-774/777)
 Athrwys ap Ffernfael (774-810)
 Idwallon ap Gwrgant (810-842)
 Ithel ap Hywel or ap Athrwys ?(842-848)
 Meurig ap Hywel or ap Ithel ? (848-849)
 Meurig ap Arthfael Hen (849-874)
 Ffernfael ap Meurig (874-880)
 Brochfael ap Meurig (880-920)
 Arthfael ap Hywel (-916/927)
 Owain ap Hywel (920-930)
 Cadell ap Arthfael (930-940/943)
 Morgan the Old, Morgan Hen or Morgan ab Owain or Morgan Hen Fawr (940/943–955) united the former kingdoms of Gwent and Glywysing in 942 under the name of Morgannwg but they were broken up again immediately after his death and remained separate until about 1055
 Nowy ap Gwriad ap Brochfael ap Rhodri ap Arthfael Hen ruled Gwent (c. 950–c. 970) while Glywysing was ruled jointly by brothers of Owain ap Morgan (dates unknown), probably under Morgan the Old
 his son, Arthfael ap Nowy (about 970–983)
 his cousin, Rhodri ap Elisedd (983–c. 1015) who ruled jointly with his brother,
 Gruffydd ap Elisedd (983–c. 1015)
 his cousin (?) Edwyn ap Gwriad (1015–1045)
 Hywel ab Owain's son, Meurig ap Hywel (1045–1055) who ruled jointly with
 his son, Cadwgan ap Meurig (1045–1055) 
 Gruffydd ap Llywelyn, invader and prince of Gwynedd (1055–1063)
 Cadwgan ap Meurig (1063–1074) who was also King of Morgannwg, ruling Glywysing through
 Gruffydd ap Rhydderch's son, Caradog ap Gruffydd (1075–1081) who seized Gwent and the Kingdom of Morgannwg
 Iestyn ap Gwrgan(t) (1081–1091)

Iestyn was the last ruler of an independent Morgannwg, which was thereafter in the possession of the Normans and became the lordship of Glamorgan

 Owain ap Caradog (1081-1113/1116)

Powys

Kings of Powys

House of Gwertherion 
 Gwrtheyrn (High-King Vortigern), married to Sevira, daughter of Magnus Maximus
 Cadeyern Fendigaid (c. 430–447), reputed to be the eldest son of Gwrtheyrn, blessed by Saint Germanus
 Cadell Ddyrnllwg (c. 447–460)
 Rhyddfedd Frych (c. 480)
 Cyngen Glodrydd (c. 500)
 Pasgen ap Cyngen (c. 530)
 Morgan ap Pasgen (c. 540)
 Brochwel Ysgithrog (c. 550)
 Cynan Garwyn (?–610)
 Selyf ap Cynan (610–613)
 Manwgan ap Selyf (613)
 Eiludd Powys (613–?)
 Beli ap Eiludd (c. 655)
 Gwylog ap Beli (695?–725)
 Elisedd ap Gwylog (725–755?)
 Brochfael ap Elisedd (755?–773)
 Cadell ap Brochfael (773–808)
 Cyngen ap Cadell (808–854) - throne usurped by Rhodri Mawr of Gwynedd and exiled to Rome where the family endured

House of Manaw 
 Rhodri Mawr (854–878) of Gwynedd, allegedly inheriting through his mother Nest, according to some manuscripts. Other manuscripts (eg. Mostyn manuscript 117) have his mother as Essyllt ferch Cynan (thought to be the daughter of Cynan Dindaethwy of Gwynedd).
 Merfyn ap Rhodri (878–900) (house of Aberffraw)
 Llywelyn ap Merfyn (900–942) (house of Aberffraw)
 Hywel Dda (942–950) (house of Dinefwr usurped from the Aberffraw line of Manaw)
 Owain ap Hywel (950–986) (Mathrafal dynasty, cadet branch of the House of Dinefwr)
 Maredudd ap Owain (986–999)
 Llywelyn ap Seisyll (999–1023), husband of Angharad, daughter of Maredudd ab Owain
 Rhydderch ap Iestyn (1023–1033)
 Iago ap Idwal (1033–1039)
 Gruffydd ap Llywelyn, invader and prince of Gwynedd (1039–1063)

Mathrafal Princes of Powys 
 Bleddyn ap Cynfyn (1063–1075)
 Iorwerth ap Bleddyn (1075–1103 (part))
 Cadwgan ap Bleddyn (1075–1111 (part))
 Owain ap Cadwgan (1111–1116 (part))
 Maredudd ap Bleddyn (1116–1132)
 Madog ap Maredudd (1132–1160)

From 1160 Powys was split into two parts. The southern part was later called Powys Wenwynwyn after Gwenwynwyn ab Owain "Cyfeiliog" ap Madog, while the northern part was called Powys Fadog after Madog ap Gruffydd "Maelor" ap Madog.

See also

King of the Britons
Prince of Wales
Family tree of Welsh monarchs

Notes

References
Lives of the Cambro British saints, William Jenkins Rees, Thomas Wakeman, 1835
A history of Wales from the earliest times, John Edward Lloyd, 1911
The Cambrian, A Bi-Monthly Published in the interest of the Welsh people and their descendantsin the United States, 1881, Vol. 1, 1881
Biography from the Dictionary of Welsh Biography
The Welsh Academy Encyclopaedia of Wales, University of Wales Press, 2008, 

 List
Wales
Rulers
Wales